Have You Heard of Christmas? is a holiday musical comedy TV special written by and starring Matt Rogers. The special was released on Dec. 2, 2022 on Showtime and features original songs, stand-up, and comedy sketches from Rogers and guest stars. The TV special was filmed at Joe's Pub in New York City in front of a live audience with Rogers being accompanied by Henry Koperski on the piano. Rogers also performed the special in a North American tour in the winter of 2022.

Synopsis 
Have You Heard of Christmas? follows Matt Rogers and his journey to becoming part of the Christmas canon and establishing himself as the "Pop Prince of Christmas." The musical numbers are intercut with comedic sketches of Rogers and his team coordinating his special and attempting to book the "Queen of Christmas" herself, Mariah Carey. The nine original musical numbers cover topics such as love, infidelity, God, and the true meaning of Christmas.

Musical Numbers 
Note: Song titles are not officially listed

 "(Also) It's Christmas"
 "Lube for the Sleigh"
 "Have You Heard of Christmas"
 "Hottest Female up in Whoville" (with a spoken word introduction of Where Are You Christmas?)
 "Every Christmas Eve"
 "Rockafella Centa"
 "I'ma Have Your Back (This Christmas)" (featuring Josh Sharp and Aaron Jackson)
 "God & His Tricks (I Am Real)"
 "You Still Make it Rain (On Christmas)"

Cast 
Matt Rogers

Bowen Yang

Jo Firestone

Henry Koperski

Josh Sharp

Aaron Jackson

Pat Regan

Natalie Walker

Desi Domo

Sarah Grace Welbourn

Reception 
Have You Heard of Christmas? was met with an overall positive reception by critics and audiences. The special currently holds an audience approval rate of 83% on Rotten Tomatoes. Vulture Magazine critic Kathryn VanArendonk called the special " incredible... buoyant and shiny and memorable, and by making it a musical special, Rogers captures that ineffable thing about the holiday that’s so captivating and inane and hard to hit." Variety Magazine writer Marc Malkin praised Roger's performance, calling the special "proudly queer with Sandra Bernhard’s comedy, Liza Minelli’s camp and Hugh Jackman’s showmanship running through Rogers’ rainbow-colored tinsel." In Describer Magazine, Sean L. McCarthy states: "Rogers both seeks to deconstruct and mock the Christmas industrial shopping complex, while also placing himself firmly within its firmament."

References 

Christmas television specials
Showtime (TV network) original programming
Comedy
Christmas